Mohamed Amin Fikry (born 7 March 1941) is an Egyptian former sports shooter. He competed at the 1964 Summer Olympics and the 1984 Summer Olympics.

References

1941 births
Living people
Egyptian male sport shooters
Olympic shooters of Egypt
Shooters at the 1964 Summer Olympics
Shooters at the 1984 Summer Olympics
Place of birth missing (living people)